Vinička Kršla is a village in the municipality of Vinica, North Macedonia.

The village is located on the eastern edge of the Kochansko polje, a fertile valley built by the river Bregalnica. The village is 15 km east of the nearest town, Kochana. The settlement is laid at approximately 460 meters above sea level. The Golak Mountains rise east of the settlement.

The main climate is continental.

Demographics
According to the 2002 census, the village had a total of 99 inhabitants. Ethnic groups in the village include:

Macedonians 99

References

Villages in Vinica Municipality, North Macedonia